Panchama Baradi is a rāga belonging to the tradition of Odissi music. Falling under the meḷa of the same name, the raga uses all twelve swaras and is traditionally associated with the karuṇa rasa. It is said to be a composite of the ragas Panchama and Baradi.

Structure 
An ancient raga, Panchama Baradi has been used by hundreds of poet-composers for well-over the past many centuries. The raga is sampurna or heptatonic in its aroha and abaroha (ascent and descent). Its aroha-abaroha are bakra or nonlinear.

The raga dwells or does nyasa on the gandhara, as per tradition and evokes a solemn mood.

Compositions 
Some of the well-known traditional compositions in this raga include :

 Are Babu Syamaghana by Bhakta Charana Dasa
 Chahin Chahin To Sarani by Kabisurjya Baladeba Ratha

References 

Ragas of Odissi music